Tân Thới may refer to several commune-level subdivisions in Vietnam, including:

Tân Thới, Cần Thơ, a commune of Phong Điền District, Cần Thơ
Tân Thới, Tiền Giang, a commune of Tân Phú Đông District

See also
Tân Thới Nhất, a ward of District 12, Ho Chi Minh City
Tân Thới Nhì, a commune of Hóc Môn District in Ho Chi Minh City